Joyleen Jeffrey (born 29 October 1989) is a Paralympic sprinter from Papua New Guinea.

She represented Papua New Guinea at the 2008 Summer Paralympics, competing in the 100 metre sprint, T12 category (for visually impaired athletes). She was disqualified for stepping out of her lane.

Jeffrey had previously won two silver medals at the Oceania Paralympic Championships in 2007, in the 100 m and 200 m events, as well as a gold medal (200 m) and a silver (100 m) at the Pacific Regional Games for the Disabled that same year.

In May 2011, she won gold in the T12 100 metre event at the Arafura Games, setting a new personal best of 14.27.

References

Paralympic athletes of Papua New Guinea
Athletes (track and field) at the 2008 Summer Paralympics
Papua New Guinean female sprinters
1989 births
Living people